Addison Smith McClure (October 10, 1839 – April 17, 1903) was an American lawyer and politician who served two non-consecutive terms as a U.S. Representative from Ohio in the late 19th century.

Biography
Born in Wooster, Ohio, McClure pursued an academic course in Jefferson College, Canonsburg, Pennsylvania (now Washington & Jefferson College). He studied law in the office of Martin Welker, was admitted to the bar in 1861, thereafter practicing in Wooster.  He entered the Army as a private in April 1861. He was elected captain of Company H, Sixteenth Regiment, Ohio Volunteer Infantry, in October of the same year. He was captured December 29, 1862, during the Vicksburg Campaign, and held as a prisoner of war until he was exchanged in May 1863. He was discharged in August 1864.

He served as recorder of Wayne County in 1867.  He was also appointed postmaster of Wooster in 1867, and reappointed in both 1872 and 1876.  He served as delegate to the Republican National Convention in 1868 and 1876.

McClure married Mary L. Brigham of Vienna Township, Michigan on September 26, 1866. They had one son.

Congress 
McClure was elected as a Republican to the Forty-seventh Congress (March 4, 1881 – March 3, 1883).  While he was not reelected in 1882, he was elected to the Fifty-fourth Congress (March 4, 1895 – March 3, 1897). Again failing to be reelected in 1896, McClure resumed the practice of law.

Death 
He died in Wooster, Ohio, on April 17, 1903.  He was interred in Wooster Cemetery.

See also

References

 Retrieved on 2009-02-26

1839 births
1903 deaths
People from Wooster, Ohio
Washington & Jefferson College alumni
Union Army officers
People of Ohio in the American Civil War
American Civil War prisoners of war
19th-century American politicians
Republican Party members of the United States House of Representatives from Ohio